A47 may refer to:
 Queen's Indian Defense, Encyclopaedia of Chess Openings code
 Focke-Wulf A.47, a meteorological aircraft developed in Germany in 1931

 roads
 A47 road, a road connecting Birmingham and Lowestoft in England
 A47 motorway (France), a road connecting Givors and Saint-Étienne
 A47 motorway (Spain), a proposed road to connect Las Nieves and Rosal de la Frontera